Hamed Sarlak is an Iranian footballer who plays for Sanat Naft Abadan F.C. in the IPL.

References

Living people
Sanat Naft Abadan F.C. players
Iranian footballers
1989 births
Association football midfielders